"Sending Me Roses" is the third single of Dutch pop singer Do from her second album, Follow Me. It was released only for download.

Track listing
Download Track
"Sending Me Roses"

Video 
The video was shot in Bonaire. It is the continued story of "Beautiful Thing" where Do is now sick of the games her lover plays and cannot take it any more. 

In Beautiful Thing she was singing about how good love is; while in Sending Me Roses she seems to be over that.

External links
 Video on Youtube
 Official website

Do (singer) songs
2006 singles
2006 songs
Sony BMG singles